Epinotia majorana is a species of moth of the family Tortricidae. It is found in north-eastern China, Korea, Japan and Russia.

The wingspan is 12–15 mm.

The larvae feed on Heracleum moellendorfii, Daucus carota var. sativa and Betula dahurica.

References

Moths described in 1916
Eucosmini